The name Nando has been used in the Philippines by PAGASA in the Western Pacific, after Typhoon Lingling (Nanang) was retired in 2001.

Typhoon Kirogi (2005) (T0520, 21W, Nando)
 Typhoon Koppu (2009) (T0915, 16W, Nando) – struck China.
 Severe Tropical Storm Kong-rey (2013) (T1315, 14W, Nando)
 Tropical Depression 22W (2017) (Nando)
 Tropical Depression Nando (2021) – only recognized by JMA and PAGASA.

Pacific typhoon set index articles